Cribrochalina is a genus of sponges with eight described species.

Species
 Cribrochalina brassicata (Carter, 1885)
 Cribrochalina compressa (Carter, 1883)
 Cribrochalina dendyi (Whitelegge, 1901)
 Cribrochalina dura (Wilson, 1902)
 Cribrochalina punctata (Ridley & Dendy, 1886)
 Cribrochalina vasculum (Lamarck, 1814)
 Cribrochalina vasiformis (Carter, 1882)
 Cribrochalina zingiberis (Sollas, 1879)

References 

Sponge genera
Haplosclerida